Hebeloma domardianum is a species of mushroom in the family Hymenogastraceae.

domardianum